Quincy Guerrier (born May 13, 1999) is a Canadian college basketball player for the Oregon Ducks of the Pac-12 Conference. He previously played for the Syracuse Orange.

Early life and career
Guerrier played soccer and street hockey before focusing on basketball. He attended Thetford Academy in Thetford Mines, Quebec for five years, turning down offers from larger schools. In 2018, Guerrier was named team most valuable player at the BioSteel All-Canadian Game. He averaged 24.7 points and 6.2 rebounds per game in his final season with Thetford. Guerrier competed for Brookwood Elite and CIA Bounce on the Amateur Athletic Union circuit. He committed to playing college basketball for Syracuse over offers from Illinois and Oregon.

College career
Guerrier was unable to enroll at Syracuse University in January 2019 because his academic records were not presented to the National Collegiate Athletic Association (NCAA) in time. He joined the team in the following semester. On February 11, 2020, Guerrier recorded a freshman season-high 16 points and 10 rebounds in a 79–74 loss to NC State. As a freshman, he served as his team's sixth man, averaging 6.9 points and 5.3 rebounds per game. Guerrier underwent surgery on June 2 to repair a torn muscle in his groin. On December 21, he was named ACC Player of the Week after a 27-point, 11-rebound performance in an overtime win over Buffalo and an 18-point, 16-rebound effort against Northeastern. Guerrier averaged 13.7 points and 8.4 rebounds per game as a sophomore, and had four 20-point games and 8 double-doubles. He was named to the Third Team All-ACC. On May 20, 2021, Guerrier announced that he would transfer to Oregon.

National team career
Guerrier represented Canada at the 2016 FIBA Under-17 World Championship in Zaragoza. In four games, he averaged 5.5 points and two rebounds per game.

Career statistics

College

|-
| style="text-align:left;"| 2019–20
| style="text-align:left;"| Syracuse
| 32 || 0 || 20.3 || .497 || .125 || .606 || 5.3 || .6 || .5 || .8 || 6.9
|-
| style="text-align:left;"| 2020–21
| style="text-align:left;"| Syracuse
| 28 ||28 || 32.9 || .492 || .311 || .673 || 8.4 || .8 || .8 || 1.1 || 13.7
|- class="sortbottom"
| style="text-align:center;" colspan="2"| Career
| 60 || 28 || 26.2 || .493 || .265 || .639 || 6.8 || .7 || .6 || 1.0 || 10.1

Personal life
His father, Steve Guerrier, played baseball in Montreal, while his mother, Saoua Melissa Lemay Nague, is a former ballet dancer. He is the oldest of four children. Guerrier speaks English, French and Haitian Creole.

References

External links
Oregon Ducks bio
Syracuse Orange bio

1999 births
Living people
Basketball players from Montreal
Canadian expatriate basketball people in the United States
Canadian men's basketball players
Oregon Ducks men's basketball players
Small forwards
Syracuse Orange men's basketball players